Edmund Knox may refer to:

 Edmund Knox (bishop of Manchester) (1847–1937), English bishop
 Edmund Knox (bishop of Limerick, Ardfert and Aghadoe) (1772–1849), absentee Irish bishop
 Edmund Vesey Knox (1865–1921), Irish nationalist politician
 E. V. Knox (Edmund George Valpy Knox, 1881–1971), British journalist known under the pen-name 'Evoe'